This is a list of all people who have lectured at the Red Bull Music Academy since its foundation in 1998.

A 
 A Guy Called Gerald
 A-Trak
 Aba Shanti-I
 Adam Freeland
 Addison Groove
 Adrian Sherwood
 African Dope
 Ahmir "Questlove" Thompson
 Akim Walta
 Alec Empire
 Alex Barck
 Alex Droener
 Alex Rosner
 Alex Smoke
 Alex Tumay
 Alexander Bretz
 Alexander Hacke
 Alexander Robotnick
 Ali Shaheed Muhammad
 Alice Russell
 Alva Noto
 Alvin Lucier
 Amp Fiddler
 Analogue Freestyle
 Andre Langenfeld
 Andrew Jervis
 Andrew Scheps
 Andrew Weatherall
 Anton Delecca
 Appleblim
 Arabian Prince
 Architecture in Helsinki
 Arthur Baker
 Arthur Verocai
 Arto Lindsay
 Arturo Lanz
 Artwork
 ASAP Rocky
 Atilano Gonzalez-Perez

B 
 Barnt
 Bass Dee
 Bass Odyssey
 Bassface Sascha
 Ben Long
 Ben UFO
 Benga
 Benjamin Wright Jr.
 Benny Sings
 Bernard Purdie
 Bernie Worrell
 Bettina Costanzo
 Bez Roberts
 Biz Markie
 Björk
 Black Coffee
 Black Milk
 Black Moon
 Blu
 Bob Humid
 Bob Moog
 Bob Power
 Boi-1da
 Bok Bok
 Bootsy Collins
 Brendan M Gillen
 Brent Fischer
 Brian Cross aka B+
 Brian Eno
 Brian Fallon
 Brian Jackson
 Brian Reitzell
 Bugge Wesseltoft
 Bun B
 Buraka Som Sistema
 Burle Avant
 Busy P

C 
 C-Rock
 Caribou
 Carl Craig
 Carl McIntosh
 Carly Starr
 Carola Stoiber
 Cathy Smith
 Cerrone
 Charlie Dark
 Charlie Hall
 Charlotte Gainsbourg
 Che Pope
 Chez Damier
 Chilly Gonzales
 Chloé
 Chris Baio
 Chris Jordi
 Chris Palmer
 Chris Stein
 Christian "Flake" Lorenz
 Christian Tjaben
 Chuck D
 Ciaran Cahill
 Claire Maloney
 Clams Casino
 Clare Fischer
 Claude Young
 Claudio Coccoluto
 Claudio Rispoli
 Claudio Simonetti
 Clé
 Clive Chin
 Cluster
 Conrad von Loehneysen
 Cosey Fanni Tutti
 Cosmo
 Craig Leon
 Cristian Vogel
 Cut Chemist

D 
 D-Bridge
 D'Angelo
 Dabrye
 Daito Manabe
 Dâm-Funk
 Damian Harris
 Dan Dalton
 Dan Stevens
 Dandy Jack
 Daniel Wang
 Daniele Baldelli
 Danny Breaks
 Danny Brown
 Danny Krivit
 Danny Thompson
 Darren Aronofsky
 Darshan Jesrani
 Dave Haslam
 Dave Ralph
 Dave Smith
 David Holmes
 David Matthews
 David Nerattini
 David Rodigan
 David Steele
 David Swindells
 Daz-I-Kue
 Deadbeat
 Debbie Harry
 Dego
 Dengue Dengue Dengue!
 Dennis Bovell
 Dennis Coffey
 Dennis White
 Derf Reklaw
 Derrick Carter
 Derrick May
 Dev Hynes
 Digital
 Dirk Linnewebber
 Dittmar Frohmann
 Dixon
 Dizzee Rascal
 DJ Assault
 DJ Babu
 DJ Craze
 DJ Dahi
 DJ Day
 DJ Deep
 DJ Drama
 DJ ESP
 DJ Food
 DJ Godfather
 DJ Harvey
 DJ Magic Mike
 DJ Mehdi
 DJ Premier
 DJ Radar
 DJ Rashad
 DJ Red Alert
 DJ Spinn
 DJ Toomp
 Domu
 Don Buchla
 Don Letts
 DOOM
 Don Cannon
 Dorian Moore
 Dr Bob Jones
 Dre Skull
 Dudley Perkins
 Dylan Carlson
 DZ Cuts

E 
 Earl Gateshead
 Ectomorph
 Ed Handley
 Eduardo Marote
 Efdemin
 Egyptian Lover
 El Guincho
 El-P
 Elmar Krick
 Emmanuel Jagari Chanda
 Eoin Brians
 Erlend Øye
 Erykah Badu
 Eumir Deodato
 Ewan Pearson
 Exile

F 
 Fabio
 Fabio de Luca
 FaltyDL
 Fatima Al Qadiri
 Fennesz
 Fion Higgins
 Flying Lotus
 Francesco Tristano
 Francisco López
 François K
 Frank Tope
 Frankie Knuckles
 Front 242

G 
 Gabriel Roth
 Gareth Jones
 Gary Bartz
 Gaspar Noé
 George Clinton
 George Stavropoulos
 Georgia Anne Muldrow
 Gerald 'Jazzman' Short
 Gerald Mitchell
 Gerd Gummersbach
 Gerriet Schulz
 Giggs
 Gilb'r
 Gilberto Gil
 Gilles Peterson
 Giorgio Moroder
 Glen Brady
 Glenn Branca
 Goldie
 Gotan Project
 Grandwizard Theodore
 Greg Phillinganes
 Greg Wilson
 Gyedu Blay-Ambolley

H 
 Hank Shocklee
 Hans Nieswandt
 Harold Faltermeyer
 Harry Russell
 Haruomi Hosono
 Heiko M/S/O
 Henrik Schwarz
 Herb Powers Jr.
 Hip Tanaka
 Holly Herndon
 Howard Bilerman
 Howie Weinberg
 Hudson Mohawke
 Hugh Masekela
 Hymnal

I 
 I-f
 IG Culture
 Ian Dewhirst
 Iggy Pop
 Invisibl Skratch Piklz
 Isao Tomita
 Ivan Smagghe

J 
 J Da Flex
 J Majik
 J-Rocc
 Jacques Greene
 Jah Shaka
 Jam & Lewis
 James Barton
 James Gadson
 James Holden
 James Murphy
 James Pants
 James Pennington
 Jammin' Unit
 Jason Bentley
 Jay Ahern
 Jay Electronica
 Jazzie B
 Jean-Michel Jarre
 Jef K
 Jeff Mills
 Jeremy Greenspan
 Jeremy Harding
 Jesse Saunders
 Jimmy Douglass
 Joan La Barbara
 Joe Bataan
 Joe Boyd
 Joe Goddard
 Joe Zavaglia
 Joel Martin
 John Acquaviva
 John Dent
 John Reynolds
 John Stapleton
 John Talabot
 John Tejada
 Jonathan Rudnick
 Jono Podmore
 Jordi Lloveras
 Joseph Ghosn
 Juan Atkins
 Juana Molina
 Julia Holter
 Julian Ringel
 Junior Marvin
 Just Blaze

K 
 Ka (rapper)
 Kabuki
 Kardinal Offishall
 Kaytranada
 Keiji Haino
 Keith Tucker
 Kemistry & Storm
 Ken Scott
 Kerri Chandler
 Kieran Hebden
 Killa Kela
 Kim Gordon
 Kindness
 King Britt
 Kirk Degiorgio
 Klaus Goldhammer
 Kode9
 Krept & Konan
 Kristina Andersen
 Krust
 Kutcha Edwards

L 
 L'Orchestra di Piazza Vittorio
 La Monte Young
 Lætitia Sadier
 Larry Heard
 Lars Bartkuhn
 Lars Vegas
 Laurent Garnier
 Laurie Anderson
 Lee Hirsch
 Lee Scratch Perry
 Legowelt
 Leon Ware
 Leroy Burgess
 Lonnie Liston Smith
 Lorenzo Senni
 Luther Campbell

M 
 M.I.A.
 Mad Mats
 ’Mad’ Mike Banks
 Mad Professor
 Madlib
 Makoto
 Mala
 Malcolm Cecil
 Malcom Catto
 Malcolm Cecil
 Mannie Fresh
 Marc Hype
 Marco Passarani
 Marcus Intalex
 Mario Caldato Jr.
 Mark Arm
 Mark De Clive-Lowe
 Mark Jones
 Mark Pritchard
 Mark Rae
 Mark Ronson
 Marky
 Marley Marl
 Marshall Allen
 Marshall Jefferson
 Martin Morales
 Martin Schöpf
 Martyn
 Martyn Ware
 Maseo
 Masters At Work
 Matana Roberts
 Mathew Jonson
 Matias Aguayo
 Matmos
 Matthew Herbert
 Maurice Fulton
 Mauricio Bussab
 Megan Jasper
 Mel Cheren
 Melvin Van Peebles
 Metro Boomin
MF DOOM
 Michael Kummermehr
 Michael Mayer
 Michael Reinboth
 Michael Thorpe
 Michaela Melian
 Michel Gaubert
 Mike Gee
 Mike Paradinas
 Mike Q
 Mike WiLL Made-It
 Mira Calix
 Miss Djax
 Mixmaster Morris
 Mixologists
 Mizell Brothers
 MJ Cole
 Mo
 Mobb Deep
 Modeselektor
 Moodymann
 Morgan Geist
 Moritz von Oswald
 Morton Subotnick
 Move D
 Mtume
 Mu
 Mulatu Astatke

N 
 Neil Aline
 Neil Macey
 Nick Coplowe
 Nick Harris
 Nicky Siano
 Nicolas Godin
 Nicolay
 Nigel Godrich
 Nile Rodgers
 Norman Jay
 Nottz
 Nuts

O 
 Oh No
 Oisin Lunny
 Om'Mas Keith
 Oneohtrix Point Never
 Orlando Voorn
 Osunlade
 Otomo Yoshihide
 Owusu & Robin Hannibal

P 
 Papa Wemba
 Patife
 Patrice
 Patrick Adams
 Patrick Carpenter
 Patrick Forge
 Patrick Pulsinger
 Paul Bradshaw
 Paul de Barros
 Paul Humphrey
 Paul Kelly
 Paul Murphy
 Paul Riser
 Paul Woolford
 Pauline Oliveros
 Peaches
 Peanut Butter Wolf
 Pearson Sound
 Pépé Bradock
 Peshay
 Pete Holdsworth
 Pete Riley
 Peter Brötzmann
 Peter Decuypere
 Peter Grandl
 Peter Hook
 Peter Untersander
 Peter Zinovieff
 Phaderheadz
 Phil Asher
 Philip Glass
 Philippe Zdar
 Phonte
 Pierre Gagnon
 Plastician
 Prince Paul
 Prins Thomas

Q 
 Q-Tip
 Qua

R 
 Radio Slave
 Rakim
 Randy Muller
 Rashad Becker
 Ready D
 Recloose
 Richie Hawtin
 Rick Essig
 Ritu
 Roach & DJ Dope
 Rob Bowman
 Robert Hood
 Robert Feuchtl
 Robert Nesbitt
 Robert Ouimet
 Robert Owens
 Robert Rich
 Roberto Maxwell
 Roger Linn
 Roman Flügel
 Ron Trent
 Roots Manuva
 Roska
 Ross Allen
 RP Boo
 Rude Boy Paul
 Russell Elevado
 Ryoji Ikeda
 Ryuichi Sakamoto
 RZA

S 
 Sa-Ra Creative Partners
 Sal Principato
 Santa Cecilia Orchestra
 Santiago Salazar
 Sarah Stennett
 Sascha Lazimbat
 Sascha Vogt
 Saxon Soundsystem
 Scuba
 Sebastian Niessen
 Sebel
 Seiji
 Sergi Jordà
 Seth Troxler
 Shaheen Ariefdien
 Shane & Greg
 Sheila E.
 Shut Up & Dance
 Silver
 Sinden
 Sir Mix-A-Lot
 Skepta
 Skream
 Sleepy Brown
 Slick Rick
 Sly & Robbie
 Snowboy
 Sonny Digital
 Soulja
 Space DJz
 Spencer Weekes
 Spike Lee
 Spoony
 Steely & Clevie
 Steinski
 Stephen Mallinder
 Stephen O'Malley
 Steve Arrington
 Steve Beckett
 Steve Bunion
 Steve Reich
 Steve Spacek
 Stretch & Bobbito
 Strobocop
 Stuart Hawkes
 Supa DJ Dmitry
 Superpitcher
 Susan Rogers
 Susanne Kirchmayr
 Suzanne Ciani
 Sven Miracolo
 Sway

T 
 Tanya Tagaq
 Taz Arnold
 Teddy Riley
 Teki Latex
 Terre Thaemlitz
 Terry Farley
 The Bamboos
 The Black Madonna
 The Diplomats
 The Original Jazzy Jay
 Theo Parrish
 Thundercat
 Tiga
 Tim Hecker
 Tim ‘Love’ Lee
 Tim Westwood
 Tina Funk
 Todd Edwards
 Todd Osborn
 Todd Roberts
 Todd Rundgren
 Todd Simon
 tofubeats
 Tom Middleton
 Tom Moulton
 Tom Oberheim
 Tom Tom Club
 Tom Warrior
 Tom Zé
 Tony Allen
 Tony Andrews
 Tony Colman
 Tony Dawsey
 Tony Gable
 Tony Humphries
 Tony Nwachukwu
 Tony Visconti
 Toro y Moi
 Toshio Matsuura
 Toy Selectah
 Trevor Horn
 Trevor Jackson
 tUnE-yArDs
 Tutto Matto
 TY

U 
 Untold
 Uschi Classen
 Uther Mahmud
 Uwe Schmidt

V 
 Van Dyke Parks
 Veronica Vasicka
 Vince Degiorgio
 Volcov

W 
 Waajeed
 Wally Badarou
 Werner Herzog
 Westbam
 Wheedle’s Groove
 Win Butler
 Winston Hazel
 Wolfgang Voigt
 Woody McBride
 Wu-Tang Clan

X 
 X-Ecutioners
 Xavier Veilhan
 XRS

Y 
 Young Fathers
 Young Guru

Z 
 Zaytoven
 Ze Gonzales
 Zed Bias
 Zinc

Music educators